Agama spinosa, Gray's agama or spiny agama, is a species of lizard in the family Agamidae. It is a small lizard found in Egypt, Sudan, Ethiopia, Eritrea, Djibouti, and Somalia.

References

Agama (genus)
Reptiles described in 1831
Taxa named by John Edward Gray